Dumo Lulu-Briggs (born 13 June 1964), is a Nigerian politician, lawyer, businessman, entrepreneur and a philanthropist. He is a member of Accord and also the Governorship candidate of his party in Rivers Sate.

Early Life and education
Dumo Lulu-Briggs Was born on 13 June 1964, in Lagos and he hails from Abonnema, a town in Akuku-Toru Local Government Area in Rivers State, Nigeria. His father was Olu Benson Lulu-Briggs, Dumo Attended Ahmadu Bello University where got a degree in law.

Political career 
Dumo Lulu-Briggs began his political career as the Social Democratic Party Candidate, House of Representatives Akuku-Toru Fedral Constituency in 1992, in 1996 – 1998 he held the position as the grassroots Democratic Party National Assitant Legal adviser. In 2018, Dumo Lulu Briggs became the Rivers State All Progressives Congress (APC) governorship aspirant before he defected to Accord.

Business career
Dumo Lulu-Briggs is a politician and a business man, presently the Chairman of Platform Petroleum Limited.

References

1964 births
Living people
Rivers State lawyers